"The Space Traders" is a science fiction short story by Derrick Bell. It was originally published in 1992, and republished in the 2000 edition of Dark Matter.

Plot summary
In the year 2000, extraterrestrials arrive on Earth and offer the United States gold, safe nuclear power, and other technological advances in exchange for all of its Black citizens. They require a decision in 5 days. Gleason Golightly, a prominent Black conservative, participates in the cabinet's discussion of the proposed trade. Golightly, ordinarily an "Uncle Tom" on racial matters, is adamantly against the trade for moral reasons. The completely White cabinet discounts his moral objections because they believe the trade will fix the United States' practical environmental and economic problems.

Later, Golightly attends a meeting of Black community members. He suggests that if Black people pretend that they are getting the best part of the deal, White people will oppose it out of envy. A black preacher responds that Golightly's understanding of White psychology has merit, but he cannot go along with such a cynical ploy, and the group votes instead for boycotts and protests. 

A prominent group of American Jews forms the "Anne Frank Committee," intending to smuggle Blacks out of the country before the trade. The FBI publishes the names of the Committee's members and they are forced into hiding themselves. 

A Constitutional amendment is proposed, authorizing Congress to induce Blacks into "special service," with language modeled on the "Selective Service Act of 1918 [sic]". A national referendum on the amendment is scheduled for the 5th day by phone vote. The Supreme Court rejects several legal challenges to the referendum process, citing as precedent the majority opinion in Giles v. Harris (1903). White televangelists line up in favor of the trade.

On the 5th day, the national referendum is held. The trade is approved by a 70/30 margin. The darker skinned Black population of the United States (including Golightly himself) are rounded up by the military and sent into the extraterrestrials' ships. The ships are emptied of the promised gold, minerals and machinery, and then filled with 20 million Black men, women, and children - stripped down to a single undergarment and bound by thin chains.

Television adaptation
The story was adapted for television in 1994 by director Reginald Hudlin and writer Trey Ellis as part of the HBO anthology television film Cosmic Slop, which presented three Twilight Zone-style stories from a Black perspective. Robert Guillaume starred as Golightly and Ronald Reagan impersonator Jay Koch played the space trader spokesman, whom Bell's story described as speaking in the "familiar, comforting tones of former U.S. president Reagan."

Criticism and controversy
Judge Alex Kozinski has criticized the story as being a sign of how Bell's philosophy precludes discourse, citing the example of how in the story, American Jews would only help Black people out of a desire not to be the lowest social group in the US.

In the run-up to the 2012 U.S. presidential election, the story became a vehicle for political controversy.  In The Atlantic, Conor Friedersdorf replied, arguing that the story's critics "would do well to acknowledge that for many decades of American history, including years during Professor Bell's life, a majority of Americans would have voted in favor of trading blacks for fantastic wealth, unlimited energy, and an end to pollutants."

See also
 Compromise of 1877
 Treaty of New Echota

References

External links

"The Space Traders", full text of the short story

1992 short stories
Fiction set in 2000
African-American short stories
Afrofuturism
Science fiction short stories
Short stories adapted into films